William Middleton Campbell (1849–1919) was Governor of the Bank of England from 1907 to 1909.

Early life
William Middleton Campbell was born in 1849. He was the son of Colin Campbell (Junior) of Colgrain and Camis Eskan (1818–86), a wealthy sugar merchant who owned plantations in British Guiana. He was educated at Eton College.

Career
Campbell was a director of the Bank of England from 1886 and Governor from 1907 to 1909, having served as the Deputy Governor from 1905 to 1907.

Personal life
He married Edith Agneta Bevan (1850–1929), the daughter of the banker Robert Cooper Lee Bevan (1809–1890). Their son Norman Robert Campbell (1880–1949) was a physicist and philosopher of science.

Death
He died in 1919.

References

1849 births
1919 deaths
People educated at Eton College
Governors of the Bank of England
Deputy Governors of the Bank of England
19th-century English businesspeople